Hisatada Otaka (Japanese: 尾高尚忠; 26 September 1911 – 16 February 1951) was a Japanese composer and conductor. He was the conductor of the NHK Symphony Orchestra from 1942 to 1951.

Otaka was born in Japan and studied in musical arts early, however he dropped out of high school and moved to Vienna for 6 years for conducting and composing, during his studies in Vienna he became friends with Andrzej Panufnik and started composing works. In 1940, Otaka moved back to Japan where he would take the role as an active conductor for the NHK Symphony Orchestra, become a music teacher and compose most of his significant works such as his Symphony and Cello Concerto, however his life came to an abrupt end at the age of 39, leaving an unfinished Flute Concerto rewrite which one of his students, Hikaru Hayashi, would take on and complete.

When Otaka died he left behind three children, all of whom play his work regularly particularly the youngest son Tadaaki Otaka. In 1953, the NHK Symphony Orchestra created the Otaka Prize, which is named after Hisatada Otaka for his role in helping the orchestra. Otaka had written one of the first Japanese cello concertos and the first Japanese flute concerto, the latter being played regularly as Otaka's most famous work.

Life

Early life, studies in Vienna
Otaka studied at the Tokyo Prefectural Fifth Junior High School. After graduating there, Otaka decided to choose a career path in music and studied at the Seijo High School (which would become Seijo University), however he dropped out. To continue his music studies Otaka moved to Vienna to study music briefly from 1931 to 1932, he studied under  for piano, Richard Stehl for music theory. After the short stay, Otaka moved back to Japan to study composition with Klaus Pringsheim and piano with Leo Sirota. However, this too was short as he moved back to Vienna in 1934 to study composition with Joseph Marx, and conducting with Felix Weingartner, from his 6-year stay in Vienna (1934 - 1940), Otaka would be an active conductor and composer. In 1937, Otaka won a Japanese-European music competition for his first Japanese Suite, he was awarded by Felix Weingartner. In 1939, Otaka controversially conducted the Berlin Reichsorchester, as Otaka played Japanese pieces, this was seen as a symbol of Nazi-Japan relations, although Otaka never had an incident like this later on. At some point after 1936, Otaka and his wife Misao (who also played the piano) met and became friends with Andrzej Panufnik, who also came to Vienna to study conducting under Weingartner. The Panufnik and Otaka family would stay close and remain in contact, as Otaka's son, Tadaaki Otaka would perform Panufnik's works regularly.

Return to Japan

In 1940, the Otakas left and moved to Japan, where Hisatada would live the rest of his life in. Originally, he was helping Joseph Rosenstock who was conducting the Japan Symphony Orchestra (Also known at the time as the Nippon Symphony Orchestra, later known as the NHK Symphony Orchestra). He made his Japanese conductor debut in January 1941. In 1942 Otaka became a conductor of the orchestra, along with Rosenstock, and Kazuo Yamada. Otaka supposedly was highly respected as a conductor up until his sudden death in 1951. Of which, he was succeeded by Kurt Woss.

Besides conducting, Otaka also composed prolifically, and had taught Hikaru Hayashi, Kan Ishii, and Kikuko Kanai. Among Otaka's compositions are his first symphony ("Society for the Construction of the Bell Tower of Peace"), Cello Concerto (1944), Flute Concerto, and Rhapsody for Piano and Orchestra (1943).

Death and legacy
On 16 February 1951, Hisatada Otaka died at the age of 39, by what Andrzej Panufnik says was from overwork.

Due to his heavy contributions and long stay with the Japanese Symphony Orchestra, the Otaka Prize was created in honour of him. However, after his death, the orchestra's name changed to the NHK Symphony Orchestra because of funding received by the Nippon Hōsō Kyōkai (Japanese Broadcasting Corporation).

Hisatada Otaka's youngest son, Tadaaki Otaka, conducts his father's work regularly, along with the works of Andrzej Panufnik.

Hisatada's other children, Michiko Otaki and Atsutada Otaki, also play his work. Such as the piano duet piece Midare.

Personal life
Hisatada Otaka married Misao Otaka before 1940, because according to Panufnik, they were married and would often invite Panufnik to their house.

When the couple moved to Japan, they had 2 sons and 1 daughter. Michiko Otaki (in or after 1940), was the only daughter, she is a pianist. Atsutada Otaka, (1944) is the eldest son, he is a musicologist and a composer. The youngest son, Tadaaki Otaka, (1947) is a popular Japanese conductor, a permanent conductor of the NHK Symphony Orchestra since 2010, the first Japanese person to win the Elgar Medal, and musical director of the Osaka Philharmonic Orchestra.

When Hisatada Otaka died in 1951, the couple's kids were still only children (Tadaaki only being 4 years old), and therefore Misao Otaka was left as a widowed mother.

Selected compositions
Japanische Suite No. 1 (Nihon Kumikyoku) (Op. 12; 1936)
Sinfonietta for Strings (1937)
Japanische Suite No. 2 (Op. 18; Premiered 2 December 1939)
Midare Capriccio for 2 pianos (Op. 11 1939; rev. 1947?) (Premiered 2 December 1939)
Sonatine for piano (Op. 13; 1940)
Piano Trio (1941)
Rhapsody for Piano and Orchestra (1943)
2 String Quartets 
String Quartet No. 1 (1938)
String Quartet No. 2 (1943)
Cello Concerto (1944)
Poem for Soprano and Orchestra (Circa. 1944)
Symphony No. 1 Society for the Construction of the Bell Tower of Peace (incomplete or partially lost) (Op. 35; 1948-1949)
Movements:
Maestoso - Allegro appassionato
Adagio assai sostenuto, molto espressivo ‒ Andante con moto, ma sempre sostenuto ‒ Adagio sostenuto
Flute Concerto (Op. 30a 1948; 30b 1951)
Concerto for Piano and String Symphony (????)

The most popular of Otaka's work is his flute concerto, which is played and recorded commonly, and was supported among his peers.

Style
Otaka's style reflects much of his teachers in the 1930s, showing Viennese and German styles. Although unlike his teacher Joseph Marx, Otaka stayed within the zone of tonality, going with more traditional later Romantic styles, rather than the growing atonal or modern styles. Many of his pieces like the Cello Concerto, Midare, Symphony No. 1 - The Construction of the Bell Tower of Peace still keep in tune with his original Japanese-music style and culture. As such, Otaka's pieces result in a combination between eastern Japanese styles, and older tonal Germanic-Viennese style, even during his early studies in Vienna, Otaka showed Japanese traditional music, such as in his Japanische Suites, where Otaka made his pieces deliberately to "find new means of expression for the Japanese spirit... into the western tonal language", which was different compared to some of his peers who wrote only focusing on the European musicality.

Flute concerto
However, the flute concerto Op. 30 is written in a specific French romantic style, although with distinct sections Japanese themes, it is written differently than many other concert works by Otaka, seemingly independent from the style of his teachers from Germany and Vienna, The Guardian said the piece had a "jazzy inflection" during the slower movement of the concerto, due to the French style and structure many French flautists performed the piece such as Jean-Pierre Rampal and Emmanuel Pahud and was popular in France.

References

Notes

External links

Further reading

1911 births
1951 deaths
Japanese classical composers
Japanese conductors (music)
Japanese male classical composers
Japanese male conductors (music)